Barnwell is a city in and county seat of Barnwell County, South Carolina, United States, located along U.S. Route 278. The population was 4,750 at the 2010 census.

Geography
Barnwell is located east of the center of Barnwell County at  (33.244534, −81.363214). Turkey Creek, a tributary of the Salkehatchie River, runs through the city just west of the downtown, and includes a small impoundment known as Lake Brown in the north part of the city.

U.S. Route 278 passes through the city, leading south  to Allendale and northwest  to Augusta, Georgia. State highways 3, 70, 64 also pass through the city; SC 64 leads west  to the east entrance of the Savannah River Site, which is a nuclear reservation.

Demographics

2020 census

As of the 2020 United States census, there were 4,652 people, 1,685 households, and 1,096 families residing in the city.

2000 census
As of the census of 2000, there were 5,035 people, 2,035 households, and 1,353 families residing in the city. The population density was 659.5 people per square mile (254.8/km2). There were 2,304 housing units at an average density of 301.8 per square mile (116.6/km2). The racial makeup of the city was 49.81% White, 47.37% Black, 1.05% Asian, 0.40% Native American, 0.04% Pacific Islander, 0.34% from other races, and 0.99% from two or more races. Hispanic or Latino of any race were 0.62% of the population.

There were 2,035 households, out of which 34.3% had children under the age of 18 living with them, 40.2% were married couples living together, 22.1% had a female householder with no husband present, and 33.5% were non-families. 30.2% of all households were made up of individuals, and 12.5% had someone living alone who was 65 years of age or older. The average household size was 2.42 and the average family size was 3.01.

In the city, the population was spread out, with 28.4% under the age of 18, 8.9% from 18 to 24, 27.6% from 25 to 44, 20.3% from 45 to 64, and 14.8% who were 65 years of age or older. The median age was 35 years. For every 100 females, there were 86.8 males. For every 100 females age 18 and over, there were 79.7 males.

The median income for a household in the city was $26,722, and the median income for a family was $37,841. Males had a median income of $35,039 versus $21,912 for females. The per capita income for the city was $17,709. placing it in the top third of the state. About 20.4% of families and 22.0% of the population were below the poverty line, including 30.5% of those under age 18 and 16.7% of those age 65 or over.

History
In 1785 the district of Winton County was formed from a portion of the Orangeburg District in order to create another judicial circuit. It was given its current name in 1798 when the county and its seat were named for Revolutionary War leader John Barnwell (1748–1800), who headed a militia in South Carolina. Barnwell County originally stretched from the Savannah River on the west almost to the Atlantic Ocean.

Built in 1832, the South Carolina Railroad connected Charleston to Hamburg, near Augusta, Georgia, upriver on the Savannah River. The designation of two stops on the railroad led to the development of the towns of Blackville and Williston in the mid-nineteenth century.

Civil War
Barnwell gave generously to the Confederate cause. Its most distinguished participant was Confederate General Johnson Hagood, who was later elected as governor of South Carolina, serving.

When Union General Judson Kilpatrick was in Barnwell, as part of General Sherman's March to the Sea, his horses were stabled in the Episcopal Church of the Holy Apostles; the baptismal font in the church was used to water the horses.

Registered historic sites
Banksia Hall, Bethlehem Baptist Church, Church of the Holy Apostles Rectory, Church of the Holy Apostles, Episcopal, and Old Presbyterian Church are listed on the National Register of Historic Places.

Education
Barnwell has a public library, a branch of the ABBE Regional Library System.

Climate
The climate in this area is characterized by relatively high temperatures and evenly distributed precipitation throughout the year.  According to the Köppen Climate Classification system, Barnwell has a Humid subtropical climate, abbreviated "Cfa" on climate maps.

Notable people

 Solomon Blatt, Jr., United States District Court judge
 Solomon Blatt, Sr., South Carolina state representative; member of the "Barnwell Ring"
 Edgar Brown, South Carolina state senator; member of the "Barnwell Ring"
 James Brown, R&B singer, songwriter, arranger, and dancer
 Troy Brown, New England Patriots wide receiver
 Joseph Emile Harley, South Carolina governor; member of the "Barnwell Ring"
 Barry Miller, Texas lawyer and politician
 James T. Moore, Marine Corps lieutenant general during World War II
 R. Winston Morris, professional tuba player and teacher
 Henry Louis Wallace, serial killer

See also

 List of cities in South Carolina

References

External links

 
 The People-Sentinel, Barnwell's weekly newspaper
 South Carolina's Information Highway

Cities in South Carolina
Cities in Barnwell County, South Carolina
County seats in South Carolina
Populated places established in 1798
1798 establishments in South Carolina